Laia Ballesté Sciora (born 22 February 1999) is a Spanish footballer who plays as a defender for Primera División club Rayo Vallecano Femenino.

Club career 
After playing with Valencia's B team and spending a season with Alavés, Ballesté signed for EdF Logroño in 2020, her first experience in Spain's top division. She made her debut in the Copa de la Reina in the delayed semi-final of the 2019–20 edition, playing all 120 minutes as the club defeated Athletic Bilbao to reach the final. Logroño were defeated 3–0 by FC Barcelona in the final. She made 19 appearances and scored one goal as the club were relegated at the end of the season.

On 23 August 2021, Ballesté signed for Rayo Vallecano.

References

External links 
Laia at BDFutbol 
Profile at Txapeldunak

1999 births
Living people
Women's association football defenders
Spanish women's footballers
Footballers from Catalonia
EdF Logroño players
Rayo Vallecano Femenino players
Primera División (women) players
Deportivo Alavés Gloriosas players
People from Baix Ebre
Sportspeople from the Province of Tarragona
Valencia CF Femenino players
Segunda Federación (women) players